Made in Abyss is a Japanese manga series written and illustrated by Akihito Tsukushi, who began serializing the manga on Takeshobo's Web Comic Gamma website in 2012. Since then, the series has been compiled into eleven tankōbon volumes. Seven Seas Entertainment announced during their panel at Anime Expo 2017 that they had licensed the manga.

A manga anthology, titled , was released on July 29, 2017. On December 13, 2019, Seven Seas announced they had licensed the book, and they released it on October 6, 2020. As of July 2021, a total of four anthologies have been published.

The translator of the anime for Sentai Filmworks, Jake Jung, also adapted the manga for Seven Seas. Regarding his involvement in the English version of both media, he stated, "Made in Abyss is chock-full of terminology, so I hope fans of both media are able to enjoy a seamless experience." In addition, he has confirmed his intention to avoid gendered pronouns for both Nanachi and Marulk.

Volume list

|}

Chapters not yet in tankōbon format
The following chapters have been published on the Web Comic Gamma website, but have not yet been collected into a tankōbon volume:

Official anthologies

|}

References

External links
 
 at Seven Seas Entertainment

Made in Abyss